Everett Spur is a prominent rock spur which marks the northwest end of the Everett Range and the junction of Ebbe Glacier with Lillie Glacier, Victoria Land, Antarctica. This geographical feature was first mapped by the United States Geological Survey from surveys and U.S. Navy air photos, 1960–62, and was named by the Advisory Committee on Antarctic Names for Kaye R. Everett, a geologist at McMurdo Station, Hut Point Peninsula, Ross Island, 1967–68, and at Livingston Island, South Shetland Islands, 1968–69. This spur lies situated on the Pennell Coast, a portion of Antarctica lying between Cape Williams and Cape Adare.

References 

Ridges of Victoria Land
Pennell Coast